A list of works by or about Kate Wilhelm, American author.

Novels
 More Bitter Than Death (1962)
 The Mile-Long Spaceship (1963)
 The Clone (1965)
 The Nevermore Affair (1966)
 Andover and the Android (1966)
 The Killing Thing (1967)
 Let the Fire Fall (1969)
 The Year of the Cloud (1970)
 Margaret and I (1971)
 City of Cain (1974)
 Where Late the Sweet Birds Sang (1976)
 The Clewiston Test (1976)
 Fault Lines (1977)
 Juniper Time (1979)
 A Sense of Shadow (1981)
 Oh, Susannah! (1982)
 Welcome, Chaos (1983)
 Huysman's Pets (1985)
 Crazy Time (1988)
 Cambio Bay (1990)
 Justice for Some (1993)
 The Good Children (1998)
 The Deepest Water (2000)
 Skeletons: A Novel of Suspense (2002)
 The Price of Silence (2005)
 Death of an Artist (2012)

Barbara Holloway mysteries
Death Qualified: A Mystery of Chaos (1991)
The Best Defense (1994)
For the Defense also named Malice Prepense in hardbound editions (1996)
Defense for the Devil (1999)
No Defense (2000)
Desperate Measures (2001)
Clear and Convincing Proof (2003)
The Unbidden Truth (2004)
Sleight Of Hand (2006)
A Wrongful Death (2007)
Cold Case (2008)
Heaven is High (2011)
By Stone, By Blade, By Fire (2012)
Mirror, Mirror (2017)

Constance Leidl and Charlie Meiklejohn mysteries
The Hamlet Trap (1987)
The Dark Door (1988)
Smart House (1989)
Sweet, Sweet Poison (1990)
Seven Kinds of Death (1992)
Whisper Her Name (2012)
Collections
A Flush of Shadows: Five Short Novels (1995) – includes "With Thimbles, With Forks, and Hope", "Torch Song", "All for One", "Sister Alice", and "Gorgon Fields"
The Casebook of Constance and Charlie Volume 1 (1999) – includes "The Hamlet Trap", "Smart House", and "Seven Kinds of Death"
The Casebook of Constance and Charlie Volume 2 (2000) – includes "Sweet, Sweet Poison" and "The Dark Door", plus shorter stories "Christ's Tears", "Torch Song", and "An Imperfect Gift"
Short Stories
"Christ's Tears" April 1996
"An Imperfect Gift" Aug 1999
"His Deadliest Enemy" Mar/Apr2004

Poetry 
Collections
 Alternatives (1980)
 Four Seasons (1980)
 No One Listens (1980)
 The Eagle (1980)

Short fiction 
Collections
 The Downstairs Room (1968)
 Abyss: Two Novellas (1971) – contains "The Plastic Abyss" (1992 Nebula Award nominee, Best Novella) and "Stranger in the House"
 The Infinity Box (1975) – collection of 9 SF short stories, including 1992 Nebula Award nominee "The Infinity Box", for Best Novella
 Somerset Dreams and Other Fiction (1978)
 The Winter Beach (1981)
 Listen, Listen (1981) – contains four novellas: "Julian", "With Thimbles, With Forks and Hope", "Moongate", and "The Uncertain Edge of Reality"
 Children of the Wind (1989) – contains "Children of the Wind", "The Gorgon Field" (1986 Nebula Award nominee, Best Novella), "A Brother to Dragons, A Companion of Owls", "The Blue Ladies", and "The Girl Who Fell into the Sky"
 And the Angels Sing (1992) – collection of 12 SF short stories
 Fear is a Cold Black (2010) – collection of Wilhelm's early SF short stories
 Music Makers (2012) – collection of 5 stories: "Music Makers", "Shadows on the Wall of the Cave", "Mockingbird", "The Late Night Train", and "An Ordinary Day with Jason"
 The Bird Cage (2012) – collection of 4 stories: "The Bird Cage", "Changing the World", "The Fountain of Neptune", and "Rules of the Game"
Anthologies (edited)
 Clarion SF
 Nebula Award Stories 9
Stories

 Baby, You Were Great (1967)
 The Planners (1968)
 April Fool's Day Forever (1970)
 A Cold Dark Night with Snow (1970)
 Forever Yours, Anna (1987)
 Naming the Flowers (1992)
 I Know What You're Thinking (1994)

Non-fiction
 Storyteller: Writing Lessons & More from 27 Years of the Clarion Writers' Workshop (2005)

Notes 

Wilhelm, Kate